Pervirella is a 1997 adventure-comedy film which was directed by Alex Chandon, the film stars Emily Booth in the lead role and featured brief cameos from Jonathan Ross and Mark Lamarr.

Pervirella harbors a sex demon within her.

Plot
In the land of Condon, the deranged Queen Victoria seals the country in behind a huge wall and establishes a "Monarchy of Terror." The intellectuals and sexually liberated are persecuted and murdered. Some of them form an underground movement, the Cult of Perv, led by the Demon Nanny who dies giving birth to Pervirella, who grows at an amazing rate into a beautiful young woman. Whenever her magic necklace is removed, Pervirella becomes a raging nymphomaniac and - hunted by every interested group in Condon - teams up with special agent Amicus Reilly.

Cast
 Emily Bouffante as Pervirella
 Ron Drand as Professor Rumphole Pump
 The Shend as Monty
 Sexton Ming as Queen Victoria
 Tara Hamilton	as Ingrid Thorne
 Anthony Waghorne as Sexton Ming
 Eileen Daly as Cu-Rare
 Max Décharné as The Curator
 Lenny Fowler as Hoffman
 Helen Darling as Effete
 Hannah Walker	as Esquesa
 Mark Lamarr as Irch Bishop
 Jonathan Ross as Bish Archop
 David Warbeck as Amicus Reilly
 Benedict Martin as Erasmus Chan
 Roger Robinson as Admiral Titeship
 Rebecca Eden as Demon Nanny
 Dianne Hickman as Nurse Hagg
 Anna McMellin as Baby Pervirella
 Simon Wolfe Howard as Doctor Connery
 Jason Slater as Advisor Rectum
 Ian 'Damage' Ballard as Executioner
 Pat Prince of Wales as Sexy Older Lady
 Josh Collins as Guard / Abo Extra / Monster Gash
 Matt Brain as Duke Nehru / Soggy
 Babzotica as Lady of the Barrel / Witch Doctor
 Alex Chandon as Savage Dynamite
 Robert Black as Duke Nukem 3D
 Marie Bennet as Duchess of Muffy
 Davo M. Davenport as Eunuch
 Su Goulding as Wench
 Yvan Serrano-Fontova as Japanese Executioner / musician ( Healer Selecta/Dustaphonics)
 Austin Vince as Cheeky Chinaman
 Damian Stephens as Ninja
 Alberto Fox Miyashima as Ninja
 Mike 'Butch Body' Hurst as Killer Robot
 Sheer Khan as Flying Carpet
 John Grover as Abo Bone
 Wayne Northern as Abo Doo
 Matt Russel as Abo Stick
 Mark White as Abo Rafia / Scarred Perv
 William Loveday as Spiritual Guru
 Dirty Jacqui Burd as Cheerleader
 Dirty Terri Burd as Cheerleader
 Tequila Sunrise as Tequila Sunrise
 Demented Ant as Ant demented
 Howard J. Ford as Statue of Liberty
 Jon Ford as Peter Fonda
 Claire French-Blake as Aqua-Manda
 Anne-Marie Foss as Lovely Nubile
 Peter Godwin as Macho
 John Lee as Hairy
 Stephen Allen as Laughlin
 Steve Fettes as Erect
 Bubsi as Baldi
 James Linguard as Smelly
 Dario Ilari as Horny
 Darren Hepolitte as Spiky
 Brian Belle-Fortune as Cuddly
 Simon Booth as Cute
 Debbie Malynn as Cuter
 Helena Spostolides as Cutest
 Carlo Roberto as Cheeky
 Graham Russel as Corny
 Cathi Unsworth as Beautiful Pervette
 Bruce Brand as Beach Band

Production
Alex Chandon and Josh Collins cast over 140 actors for his film project, include Caroline Munroe, but she left the project after short time.

Release
The film was originally released as VHS Tape on 27 October 1998 in the UK. The DVD contains comprehensive biographies, the story behind the film and its music, photos and more and was released on 5 May 2002 over Eclectic DVD Distribution.

Soundtrack
The Soundtrack was released as a 'Rock'n'Roll-Victorian-Erotic-Horror-Soundtrack', composed by François Evans, it includes tracks from Frat Shack Shakedown and Perve Parlor.

References

External links

1997 films
1990s comedy horror films
British sexploitation films
British comedy horror films
1997 horror films
Films directed by Alex Chandon
1997 comedy films
1990s English-language films
1990s British films